Interfor Corporation is one of the largest lumber producers in the world. The company's sawmilling operations have a combined manufacturing capacity of over 3 billion board feet of lumber with sales to North America, Asia-Pacific and Europe. Interfor is based in Vancouver, BC and employs approximately 3400 people. In May 2014, Interfor opened its corporate office for the USA south-east region at Peachtree City, Georgia.

History 
1930s Began with a sawmill in Whonnock, BC.
1963 Incorporated as Yorkston Lumber Co.
1963 Name changed to Whonnock Lumber Co.
1967 Converted to a public company.
1967 Name changed to Whonnock Industries.
1979 Sauder Industries acquired a controlling interest in Interfor (later transferred to the Sauder family's Mountclair Investment Corporation holding company).
1988 Name changed to International Forest Products Ltd.
1995 Buy Weldwood Operation
1996 Close Bay Lumber Operation
2000 Sell Flavelle Mill
2001 Buy Primex Mills
2001 Close Fraser Mill
2002 Close MacDonald Operation/Open Sumas Operation
2004 Close Squamish Operation
2005 Buy Crown Pacific Limited Partners
2005 Buy Floragon Forest Products Molalla Inc.
2005 Close Marysville and Field Operations
2006 Sell Saltar and MacKenzie Operations
2008 Buy Portac Inc.
2008 Close Queensborough Operations  
2013 Buy Rayonier Wood Products Division
2013 Buy Keadle Lumber Enterprises Inc.
2014 Buy Tolleson Lumber Company
2014 Name changed to Interfor Corporation
2014 Close Forks/Beaver Operations
2014 Acquired properties from Simpson Lumber Company
2015 Buy Monticello Operation
2015 Close Tacoma Operation
2019 Close Hammond Operation
2020 Sell Gilchrist Operation
2021 Buy Summerville Operation, and Timmins and Gogama mills.

Products 
Interfor produces lumber for residential, commercial and industrial applications. It uses several species of wood in its products, including Douglas Fir, Western Hemlock, Western Red Cedar, Ponderosa pine, Lodgepole pine and Southern Yellow Pine. It markets European Spruce and Red Pine lumber through a sales agreement with Ilim Timber.

Mills 
Interfor has sawmills in British Columbia (BC), Washington, Oregon, Georgia, South Carolina, and Arkansas. In BC this includes one sawmill (Acorn) on the Coast; two sawmills in the Kootenay region (Grand Forks and Castlegar); and one sawmill in the Southern Interior region near Kamloops (Adams Lake).

In the US Pacific Northwest, the company operates two sawmills in Washington state (Port Angeles and Longview) and two in Oregon (Molalla and Philomath). It operates the Cedarprime remanufacturing plant in Sumas, Washington.

In the US Southeast, the company operates seven sawmills in Georgia (Baxley, Eatonton, Meldrim, Perry, Preston, Swainsboro, and Thomaston), two in South Carolina (Georgetown and Summerville), one in Arkansas (Monticello), one in Alabama (Fayette), one in Mississippi (Bay Springs), and one in Louisiana (DeQuincy).

Environmental Record 
Interfor's  woodlands and manufacturing operations have been independently certified to internationally recognized standards.

Old growth logging 
In British Columbia's Great Bear Rainforest, Interfor is known to log the oldest and rarest cedar trees.

Manufacturing 
All of Interfor's BC sawmills are Chain-of-Custody  (CoC) certified. 
Chain-of-Custody (CoC) certification tracks logs from harvest through the manufacturing process. In BC, Interfor mills are independently certified to meet Program for Endorsement of Forest Certification (PEFC) and Sustainable Forestry Initiative (SFI) CoC certification requirements. Select Interfor mills meet Forest Stewardship Council® (FSC) CoC certification requirements. Interfor's Preston and Perry Mills in the United States are certified to the SFI fiber sourcing requirements.

Awards and Accomplishments
2009 - Interfor was awarded an SFI Inc. Conservation Leadership Award for collaborative work with First Nations to ensure there is a suitable supply of monumental cedar trees to meet long-term cultural needs on British Columbia's Pacific Coast.

2007 - Interfor was a co-recipient of the World Wildlife Fund – Gift to the Earth Award to acknowledge collaborative work that led to the landmark agreements to conserve temperate rainforests in British Columbia's north and central coast regions.

Financials 
Interfor has more than doubled in size since 2002 and is one of the largest lumber companies in the world.

References

Companies listed on the Toronto Stock Exchange
Manufacturing companies based in Vancouver
Forest products companies of Canada
Renewable resource companies established in 1963
1963 establishments in British Columbia